The Brisbane Racing Club (BRC) is an Australian horse racing organization based in Brisbane in the state of Queensland.  The head office of the club is located at 230 Lancaster Road in Ascot.

History
The Brisbane Racing Club was founded on 1 July 2009 by a merger of the Queensland Turf Club and the Brisbane Turf Club (BTC). The club conducted 98 race meetings in 2012. The consolidation of the race clubs was the first of its kind in Australia as later other metropolitan race clubs would follow their initiative.

Courses
The courses operated by the BRC are Eagle Farm Racecourse and Doomben Racecourse.

Major races

The highlight on the Brisbane Racing Clubs racing calendar is the Brisbane Racing Carnival, run across five consecutive Saturdays in May and June. The highlights include the Doomben 10,000 and the AAMI Stradbroke Handicap.

References

External links 
 Official website for the Brisbane Racing Club

Horse racing organisations in Australia
Sporting clubs in Brisbane
2009 establishments in Australia
Sports clubs established in 2009